Warsaw Theatre can refer to:
Grand Theatre, Warsaw
Polish Theatre in Warsaw
National Theatre, Warsaw
or one of the smaller theatres in Warsaw.